Kenneth Gerald Gormley (born March 19, 1955) is an American lawyer, academic and novelist who is the 13th president of Duquesne University. He is a former dean and a professor of constitutional law at Duquesne University School of Law.  He is also a legal counsel for the Appellate Practice Group at the law firm Schnader Harrison Segal & Lewis LLP. His scholarly work focuses particularly on the Watergate scandal and special prosecutors.

Career
Kenneth Gerald Gormley was born in Pittsburgh on March 19, 1955, and grew up in nearby Swissvale and Edgewood. He earned a B.A. in political science and philosophy from the University of Pittsburgh in 1977 and a J.D. from Harvard Law School in 1980.

Gormley joined the Duquesne Law faculty in 1994 after clerking for U.S. District Judge Donald E. Ziegler, teaching at the University of Pittsburgh School of Law, engaging in private practice, serving as Executive Director of the Pennsylvania Legislative Reapportionment Commission, and serving as special clerk to Justice Ralph J. Cappy of the Pennsylvania Supreme Court. Gormley was named dean of the law school in December 2008.

He has written articles for publications ranging from Rolling Stone to the ABA Journal and is author of the book Archibald Cox: The Conscience of a Nation.  An expert on the constitutional crisis presented by Watergate, he has also published legal commentary on privacy issues. In 2006, he testified before the U.S. Senate regarding warrantless surveillance. His most recent book, The Death of American Virtue: Clinton vs. Starr, was released on February 16, 2010.

Gormley was nominated by Pennsylvania Governor Tom Wolf to one of two vacancies on the Pennsylvania Supreme Court in February 2015. The Pennsylvania State Senate opted not to fill the vacancies, instead allowing the seats to be filled in the November election.

On November 4, 2015, Duquesne University announced that Gormley would be the 13th President of Duquesne University, following the retirement of Charles J. Dougherty, effective July 1, 2016.

In October 2021, Gormley published his first novel, a legal thriller entitled The Heiress of Pittsburgh. He has described the novel as a "love story to Pittsburgh".

References

External links

Duquesne University faculty
Living people
Harvard Law School alumni
University of Pittsburgh alumni
American legal scholars
1955 births
Presidents of Duquesne University
Lawyers from Pittsburgh
People from Swissvale, Pennsylvania